The 2015 Betway Premier League Darts was a darts tournament organised by the Professional Darts Corporation; the eleventh edition of the tournament. The event began at the First Direct Arena in Leeds on 4 February, and ended at The O2 Arena, London on 21 May. The tournament was shown live on Sky Sports in the UK and Ireland. This was the second year that the tournament was sponsored by Betway.

Raymond van Barneveld was the defending champion, but he lost to Michael van Gerwen 10–8 in the semi-finals. Gary Anderson won his second Premier League Darts title by beating van Gerwen 11–7 in the final.

For the first time in the Premier League's history, 6 time winner Phil Taylor did not qualify for the play-offs.

Format
The tournament format was identical to that since 2013. During the first nine weeks (phase 1) each player plays the other nine players once. The bottom two players are eliminated from the competition. In the next six weeks (phase 2), each player plays the other seven players once. Phase 2 consists of four weeks where five matches are played followed by two weeks where four matches are played. At the end of phase 2 the top four players contest the two semi-finals and the final in the play-off week.

Players
The competitors who competed at the tournament were announced following the 2015 PDC World Darts Championship final on 4 January 2015, with the top four of the PDC Order of Merit joined by six Wildcards.

Robert Thornton (world number 8), Wes Newton (number 16), and Simon Whitlock (number 7) did not return from last year. James Wade returned this year following his absence from the 2014 Premier League, along with two debutants, Kim Huybrechts, the first Belgian to compete in the league, and Stephen Bunting, the 2014 BDO world champion who had a successful first year with the PDC.

Venues

Prize money
The prize money was dramatically increased to £700,000 from £550,000 in 2014.

Results

League stage

5 February – Week 1 (Phase 1)
 First Direct Arena, Leeds

12 February – Week 2 (Phase 1)
 Bournemouth International Centre, Bournemouth

19 February – Week 3 (Phase 1)
 Echo Arena, Liverpool

26 February – Week 4 (Phase 1)
 Odyssey Arena, Belfast

5 March – Week 5 (Phase 1)
 Westpoint Arena, Exeter

12 March – Week 6 (Phase 1)
 Capital FM Arena, Nottingham

19 March – Week 7 (Phase 1)
 SSE Hydro, Glasgow

26 March – Week 8 (Phase 1)
 3Arena, Dublin

2 April – Week 9 (Phase 1)
 Phones 4u Arena, Manchester

9 April – Week 10 (Phase 2)
 Motorpoint Arena, Sheffield

16 April – Week 11 (Phase 2)
 GE Oil & Gas Arena, Aberdeen

23 April – Week 12 (Phase 2)
 Motorpoint Arena, Cardiff

30 April – Week 13 (Phase 2)
 Barclaycard Arena, Birmingham

7 May – Week 14 (Phase 2)
 Metro Radio Arena, Newcastle upon Tyne

14 May – Week 15 (Phase 2)
 Brighton Centre, Brighton

Play-offs – 21 May The O2 Arena, London

Table and streaks

Table
After the first nine weeks (phase 1), the bottom two in the table are eliminated. Each remaining player plays a further seven matches (phase 2). The top four players then participate in the playoffs.

When players are tied on points, leg difference is used first as a tie-breaker, after that legs won against throw and then tournament average.

{| class="wikitable sortable" style="text-align:center;"
|-
! style="width:10px;" abbr="Position"|#
! width=200 |Name
! style="width:20px;" abbr="Played"|Pld
! style="width:20px;" abbr="Won"|W
! style="width:20px;" abbr="Drawn"|D
! style="width:20px;" abbr="Lost"|L
! style="width:20px;" abbr="Points|Pts
! style="width:20px;" abbr="Legs For"|LF
! style="width:20px;" abbr="Legs Against"|LA
! style="width:20px;" abbr="Leg Difference"|+/-
! style="width:20px;" abbr="Legs Won Against Throw"|LWAT
! style="width:20px;" abbr="Tons"|100+
! style="width:20px;" abbr="Ton Plus"|140+
! style="width:20px;" abbr="Maximums"|180s
! style="width:20px;" abbr="Average"|A
! style="width:20px;" abbr="High Checkout"|HC
! style="width:20px;" abbr="Checkout Percentage"|C%
|- bgcolor=#ccffcc
!1
|align=left|  || 16 || 10 || 3 || 3 ||23|| 101 || 71 || +30 || 38 ||  ||  || 58 || 105.15 || 160 || 47.87%
|- bgcolor=#ccffcc
!2
|align=left|   || 16 || 10 || 2 || 4 ||22|| 97 || 67 || +30 || 38 ||  ||  || 62 || 101.39 || 161 || 42.17% 
|- bgcolor=#ccffcc
!3
|align=left|    W || 16 || 9 || 2 || 5 ||20|| 90 || 80 || +10 || 28 ||  ||  || 57 || 99.83 || 152 || 38.14% 
|- bgcolor=#ccffcc
!4
|align=left|   || 16 || 8 || 3 || 5 ||19|| 90 || 82 || +8 || 31 ||  ||  || 48 || 97.64 || 161 || 41.86%
|- bgcolor=#ffcccc
!5
|align=left|   || 16 || 6 || 3 || 7 ||15|| 87 || 83 || +4 || 30 ||  ||  || 43 || 102.95 || 151 || 39.55% 
|- bgcolor=#ffcccc
!6
|align=left|   || 16 || 5 || 4 || 7 ||14|| 76 || 89 || −13 || 23 ||  ||  || 51 || 98.63 || 147 || 38.04%
|- bgcolor=#ffcccc
!7
|align=left|   || 16 || 3 || 6 || 7 ||12|| 76 || 93 || −17 || 26 ||  ||  || 23 || 97.12 || 170 || 41.14%
|- bgcolor=#ffcccc
!8
|align=left|   || 16 || 3 || 5 || 8 ||11|| 75 || 93 || −18 || 26 ||  ||  || 46 || 94.37 || 164 || 32.86%
|- bgcolor=#ffcccc
!9
|align=left|   || 9 || 1 || 4 || 4 ||6|| 40 || 57 || −17 || 10 ||  ||  || 18 || 93.77 || 170 || 36.96%
|- bgcolor=#ffcccc
!10
|align=left|   || 9 || 1 || 2 || 6 ||4|| 42 || 59 || −17 || 7 ||  ||  || 27 || 97.83 || 170 || 34.15% 
|-

Top four qualified for the Play-offs after Week 15.
NB: LWAT = Legs Won Against Throw. 
A = Average
C% = Checkout Percentage
HC = High Checkout.

Streaks

Positions by round

References

External links
Official website
Sky Sports website

2015
Premier League Darts
Premier League Darts
Premier League Darts